The 2007–08 Slovenian Football Cup was the 17th season of the Slovenian Football Cup, Slovenia's football knockout competition. 20 lower league teams played in the first two rounds and the Slovenian PrvaLiga teams joined in the Round of 16. Ihan withdrew before the start of the competition.

Qualified clubs

2007–08 Slovenian PrvaLiga members
Celje
Domžale
Drava Ptuj
Gorica
Interblock
Koper
Livar
Maribor
Nafta Lendava
Primorje

Additional place: Bela Krajina

Qualified through MNZ Regional Cups
MNZ Ljubljana:  Olimpija, Zagorje, Ihan
MNZ Maribor: Malečnik, Peca, Slivnica
MNZ Celje: Dravinja, Krško
MNZ Koper: Izola, Ankaran
MNZ Nova Gorica: Adria, Tolmin
MNZ Murska Sobota: Veržej, Čarda
MNZ Lendava: Črenšovci, Odranci
MNZG-Kranj: Šenčur, Triglav Kranj
MNZ Ptuj: Stojnci, Bukovci

First round

|}

Second round

|}

Round of 16

|}

Quarter-finals

|}

Semi-finals

|}

Final

References

 

Slovenian Football Cup seasons
Slovenian Cup
Cup